"Believe Me Baby (I Lied)" is a song recorded by American country music artist  Trisha Yearwood. It was released in July 1996 as the lead single from her album, Everybody Knows. It was Yearwood's fourth single out of five during the course of her career to reach number one on the Billboard Hot Country Songs chart.

Content
The song depicts a woman who is apologizing to her lover after saying she wanted him out of her life. She realized it had really been her "wounded pride" telling the lover to leave.

The song was written by Kim Richey, Angelo Petraglia and Larry Gottlieb and was the first single from her album, Everybody Knows. The song was a number 1 country hit for Yearwood and the title track of the album reached the Top 5 later in 1997. The song was done in an Adult Contemporary-like style according to Allmusic.com.

Critical reception
Deborah Evans Price, of Billboard magazine reviewed the song favorably, saying that the song's "strong and sure melody and its well-crafted lyrics are buoyed by Yearwood's expressive voice."

Music video
A music video was also made shortly before the song's release, showcasing Yearwood and friends in retro outfits, vintage glasses and vivid colors and backdrops. As revealed in an interview on CMT's Video bio, some of the clothing Yearwood wore in the video was raided from the closet of her then-husband Robert Reynolds. The video debuted on CMT Wednesday, June 26, 1996, on a since-cancelled weekly show, CMT Delivery Room.

Chart performance

Year-end charts

References

1996 singles
1996 songs
Trisha Yearwood songs
Songs written by Kim Richey
Song recordings produced by Garth Fundis
MCA Records singles
Songs written by Angelo Petraglia
Songs written by Larry Gottlieb